The 2003 Australian Sports Sedan Championship was a CAMS sanctioned national motor racing title open to Group 3D Sports Sedans. The title, which was the 19th Australian Sports Sedan Championship, was won by Kerry Baily driving a Nissan 300ZX Chevrolet.

Calendar

The championship was contested over a five-round series.

Points system
Championship points were awarded on a 20-17-15-14-13-12-11-10-9-8 basis for 1st through to 10th place in each race and an additional point was awarded to the driver setting the fastest time in Qualifying at each round.

Cars complying with New Zealand Tranzam regulations were eligible to compete in championship races but were not eligible to score championship points.

Results

References

National Sports Sedan Series
Sports Sedan Championship